Montz is a census-designated place (CDP) in St. Charles Parish, Louisiana, United States. The population was 1,120 at the 2000 census, and 2,106 at the 2020 census.

History

The Bonnet Carré Crevasse occurred in and near the present-day location of Montz. It was one of several levee breaches in the Bonnet Carré area in the mid-to-late-1800s. Bonnet Carré was approximately 50 kilometers from New Orleans, Louisiana. The breach occurred when excess water from the Mississippi River flowed over the east bank levee of Bonnet Carré.

Montz is located between LaPlace, Louisiana and the Bonnet Carré Spillway. It was separated from the other municipalities and communities on the east bank of the Mississippi River in St. Charles Parish by the construction of the spillway, which was completed in 1931.

On December 14, 2022, the town was hit by a destructive and deadly EF2 tornado that damaged or destroyed numerous structures, killed one person, and injured eight others.

Geography
Montz is located at  (30.018513, -90.450683).

Demographics

Education
St. Charles Parish Public School System operates public schools, including:
 Destrehan High School in Destrehan

References

Census-designated places in Louisiana
Census-designated places in St. Charles Parish, Louisiana
Census-designated places in New Orleans metropolitan area
Louisiana populated places on the Mississippi River